Șura Mare is a commune located in Sibiu County, Transylvania, Romania. It is composed of two villages, Hamba (Hahnbach;  Kakasfalva) and Șura Mare. Șura Mare was first mentioned in 1332, and Hamba in 1337.

The commune lies on the Transylvanian Plateau. It is situated in the central part of the county, just north of the county seat, Sibiu. The river Hamba flows through the commune.

At the 2011 census, 87.53% of inhabitants were Romanians and 4.75% Roma.

Evangelical Lutheran Transylvanian Saxon medieval fortified churches 

Both villages in Șura Mare have fortified churches. The church in Șura Mare is a three-apse basilica. It was built in the 13th century (the tower is from around 1300), and fortified in 1495, apparently as a response to Ottoman attacks in 1493. 

The Romanesque basilica in Hamba was built in the 13th century, however, only fragments of the tower survived. The current building originates from the beginning of the 16th century.

Gallery

References

Communes in Sibiu County
Localities in Transylvania